Milan'em Mall is a shopping mall in K.K. Nagar, Madurai, India. It was opened on 28 September 2009 and is the first shopping mall in Madurai. The mall has a food court in the third floor along with water zorbing for kids. The atrium of the mall is used to host cultural events.

References

Shopping malls in Madurai
2009 establishments in Tamil Nadu
Shopping malls established in 2009